Knockboy (An Cnoc Buí in Irish, meaning Yellow Mountain) is a 706-metre-high mountain on the border between counties Cork and Kerry in Ireland.

Geography 

Knockboy is the highest peak in the Shehy mountain range and the highest mountain in County Cork with its summit shared with County Kerry.  It is the 104th highest peak in Ireland.

Geology 
The mountain is composed of sandstone laid down in the Devonian period which was subsequently uplifted to form a mountain range, before being eroded into its present form by glaciers during the last ice age.

See also

List of Irish counties by highest point
Lists of mountains in Ireland
List of mountains of the British Isles by height
List of P600 mountains in the British Isles
List of Marilyns in the British Isles
List of Hewitt mountains in England, Wales and Ireland

References

 Irish Walk Guides 1: South West. Seán Ó Súilleabháin, 1978.

Hewitts of Ireland
Marilyns of Ireland
Mountains and hills of County Cork
Mountains and hills of County Kerry
Highest points of Irish counties
Mountains under 1000 metres